La Primavera is an outdoor fountain and sculpture installed in Mexico City's Alameda Central, in Mexico. The statue represents Persephone.

References

External links

 

Alameda Central
Fountains in Mexico
Outdoor sculptures in Mexico City
Sculptures of mythology
Sculptures of women in Mexico
Statues in Mexico City